Pedro José Lorenzo Galán (born 19 November 1967), known as Pedro José, is a Spanish former footballer who played as a defensive midfielder, currently the assistant manager of Extremadura UD.

He played 169 matches in Segunda División with Extremadura over six seasons (nine goals), adding 68 games and two goals in La Liga with the same club, which he represented for 19 years.

Club career
Born in Torremejía, Province of Badajoz, Pedro José's career was closely associated with CF Extremadura, and he only played with teams from his native region in 25 years as a senior. He represented his main club in all four major levels of Spanish football, helping it promote twice to La Liga, in 1996 and in 1998, and appearing in more than 600 competitive matches during his spell (72 goals).

Pedro José made his debut in the top flight on 1 September 1996 at the age of nearly 29, playing the full 90 minutes in a 2–1 away loss against Hércules CF. He scored the first of his two goals in the competition on 6 April of the following year, helping to a 3–0 home win over CD Logroñés, but Extremadura were ultimately relegated at the end of the season, as would be the case two years later.

Pedro José left the side in 2004 at almost 37, and played a further six years in amateur football, with Mérida UD and Imperio de Mérida CP. Subsequently, he returned to the renamed Extremadura UD as assistant coach.

References

External links

1967 births
Living people
People from Tierra de Barros
Sportspeople from the Province of Badajoz
Spanish footballers
Footballers from Extremadura
Association football midfielders
La Liga players
Segunda División players
Segunda División B players
Tercera División players
CF Extremadura footballers
Mérida UD footballers